The Pekok is a Karbi traditional item of dress, which is worn over the upper part of the body.

References

Indian clothing